Olga Algisovna Arlauskas Shimanskaya (born July 18, 1981) is a Russian-Spanish film director.

Life and career 
Olga Arlauskas was born on July 18, 1981, in Moscow. In 1991 she moved to Spain, where she studied the bachelor's degree (BA) in audiovisual communication at the University of the Basque Country (UPV/EHU).

In 2004 she got a grant from Spanish government to study filmmaking and moved back to Russia. In 2006 she graduated as a documentary filmmaker from VKSR (High Courses for Scriptwriters and Film Directors). Since then she had been working for Channel One Russia, Channel Kultura, Russia Today (Spanish version) and made nearly 20 documentary films in all possible doc genres from intimate doc portraits to prime-time TV-blockbusters.

She has been awarded by mostly all Russian and international Film Festivals for her award-winning project «Labels» (26′, 2011). She is Member of the Russian Documentary Guild.

References

External links 

 

1981 births
Living people
Russian film directors
University of the Basque Country alumni
Spanish film directors
High Courses for Scriptwriters and Film Directors alumni
Ánima Eskola School of Drama alumni
Spanish documentary film directors